From Scratch is an American drama limited series created by Attica Locke and Tembi Locke for Netflix. Inspired by Tembi Locke's memoir of the same name, it stars Zoe Saldaña and Eugenio Mastrandrea. Its eight episodes premiered on October 21, 2022. Attica Locke was series showrunner.

Cast and characters

Main

 Zoe Saldaña as Amy
 Eugenio Mastrandrea as Lino
 Danielle Deadwyler as Zora
 Judith Scott as Maxine
 Kellita Smith as Lynn
 Lucia Sardo as Filomena
 Paride Benassai as Giacomo
 Roberta Rigano as Biagia
 Keith David as Hershel

Recurring
 Lorenzo Pozzan as Filippo
 Peter Mendoza as Andreas
 Jonathan D. King as Silvio
 Terrell Carter as Ken
 Saad Siddiqui as Dr. Atluri
 Rodney Gardiner as Preston
 Jonathan Del Arco as David

Guest
 Giacomo Gianniotti as Giancarlo Caldesi
 Medalion Rahimi as Laila Mahdi
 Elizabeth Anweis as Chloe Lim
 Kassandra Clementi as Caroline
 Ferdinando Gattuccio as Italian notary
 Claudia Gerini as art teacher

Episodes

Production

Development
The series was announced on November 7, 2019. Zoe Saldaña was set to star and executive-produce. The series was created by and executive-produced by Attica Locke and Tembi Locke. Reese Witherspoon, Lauren Neustadter, Richard Abate, Jermaine Johnson and Will Rowbotham were also executive producers. Nzingha Stewart, Guy Louthan, Emily Ferenbach, Cisely Saldaña, and Mariel Saldaña were its producers.

Casting
Alongside the series announcement, Zoe Saldaña was cast. In April 2021, Eugenio Mastrandrea, Danielle Deadwyler, Keith David, Kellita Smith, Judith Scott, Lucia Sardo, Paride Benassai, and Roberta Rigano were set to star. One month later, Terrell Carter, Medalion Rahimi, Jonathan Del Arco, Peter Mendoza, Lorenzo Pozzan, and Jonathan D. King were added as recurring. Giacomo Gianniotti, Elizabeth Anweis, Kassandra Clementi, and Rodney Gardiner were set as guest stars. In July 2021, Saad Siddiqui joined the cast as a recurring character.

Filming
Filming began in Los Angeles on April 5, 2021, and moved to Florence, Italy in July. Production ended on August 7, 2021 in Cefalù, Sicily.

Reception
The review aggregator website Rotten Tomatoes reported a 94% approval rating with an average rating of 6.6/10, based on 12 critic reviews. The website's critics consensus reads, "By turns a buoyant and wistful romance, From Scratch is an emotionally resonant miniseries that benefits from its Italian scenery and Zoe Saldaña's considerable dramatic chops." Metacritic, which uses a weighted average, assigned a score of 67 out of 100 based on 8 critics, indicating "generally favorable reviews". Zoe Saldana was nominated for Outstanding Actress in a Television Movie, Mini-Series or Dramatic Special at the 54th NAACP Image Award.

References

External links
 
 

2022 American television series debuts
2022 American television series endings
2020s American drama television miniseries
English-language Netflix original programming
Television shows based on non-fiction books
Television series by 3 Arts Entertainment
Television shows filmed in Los Angeles
Television shows filmed in Italy